Rai Bahadur, Sir Kailash Chandra Bose   (26 December 1850 – 19 January 1927) was an eminent Indian medical practitioner who was one of the first Indian physicians to be knighted.

Early life

Kailash Chandra Bose was the second son of Babu Madhusudan Bose, a member of a famous Bose family of Simla, resident of Calcutta (now  Kolkata) and was born on 26 December 1850. His father and members of his family were the pioneer of steamship communication on the river Hoogly, were well known in commercial circles but also distinguished for the patronage of Science and literature. After passing through school with considerable distinction Kailash Chandra entered the Calcutta Medical College from where he graduated in the University of Calcutta in 1874.

Career

At first he entered government service as Resident Medical Officer Campbell Hospital Calcutta. But he was persuaded by a brother to leave government service and set up as a private practitioner. Within two years he had secured in Calcutta a brilliant reputation and had established a lucrative practice especially among the Marwari community. It was not long before he was recognized as the leading Indian medical practitioner in Bengal.

Social activities

He was the instrumental in the establishment of Calcutta Medical School, Sodepur Pinjarapole. He also collected funds for the establishment of Veterinary College and Hospital and School of Tropical Medicine in Calcutta.

Awards and honours

He was President of Calcutta Medical Society, Vice-President of the first Indian Medical Congress, Commissioner of Calcutta Municipality now Kolkata Municipal Corporation in 1899. He was created a Rai Bahadur in 1895. In recognition of his valuable services to Bengal he was further created a Companion of the Indian Empire (CIE), in 1900 and a fellow of the University of Calcutta for 1904 onwards. His public work was recognized by the award of the "Kaiser-i-Hind" gold medal in 1910, and in 1916, he was knighted, being the first Indian doctor to receive this honour. Amongst other honours which fell to him were the Order of the British Empire (OBE) in 1918.

References

1850 births
1927 deaths
19th-century Indian medical doctors
Bengali knights
Indian Knights Bachelor
20th-century Indian medical doctors
Medical doctors from Kolkata
Indian Officers of the Order of the British Empire
Rai Bahadurs
Companions of the Order of the Indian Empire